Carissimi is the sixth studio album by English recording artist Frankmusik. This is a project album where Turner released a song every last day of the month.  To Announce these 12 months / 12 songs  a short video teaser has been done on his social media. The album was physically released on the 8 November 2021 and digitally on 1 January 2022 and streamed via Spotify
Only a hundred signed copies were sold as CD pack on 8 November 2021 thought his social media. 

For this project album no video or lead single was definited.
The digital album is available with instrumentals songs. It also contains a previously unreleased track called "Do What" from 2019.

Visuals
One again Avisuals designed the covers and the teaser videos. This long visual collaboration ended with a  very much Bjork inspired typingfont for the Frankmusik logo and titles. Colourful designed 3D symbols were also representing the song covers.

Track listing
All songs written and produced by Frankmusik.

References

Frankmusik albums
2021 albums